Wolf is an unincorporated community in Sheridan County, Wyoming, United States.  Its elevation is 4,626 feet (1,410 m).  Although Wolf is unincorporated, it had a post office, with the ZIP code of 82844 which closed in 1993. Public education in the community of Wolf is provided by Sheridan County School District #2.

References

Unincorporated communities in Sheridan County, Wyoming
Unincorporated communities in Wyoming